Diarmuid O'Connor (born 10 January 1995) is an Irish sportsperson. He has played Gaelic football at senior level for both his club Ballintubber and the Mayo county team.

He was awarded the All Stars Young Footballer of the Year in 2015 and 2016.

References

1995 births
Living people
All Stars Young Footballers of the Year
DCU Gaelic footballers
Mayo inter-county Gaelic footballers